Georges Jean Franz Köhler (17 April 1946 – 1 March 1995) was a German biologist.

Together with César Milstein and Niels Kaj Jerne, Köhler won the Nobel Prize in Physiology or Medicine in 1984, "for work on the immune system and the production of monoclonal antibodies". Milstein and Köhler's technique for producing monoclonal antibodies laid the foundation for the exploitation of antibodies for diagnostics, therapeutics and many other scientific applications.

Career
Köhler was born in Munich. In April 1974 he started a post-doctoral research fellowship at the Laboratory of Molecular Biology in Cambridge, UK where he began working with César Milstein to develop a laboratory tool that could help them investigate the mechanism that underlies the diversity of antibodies. It was during this work that they devised their hybridoma technique for the production of antibodies. Köhler continued his collaboration on the technique when he returned to Basel Institute of Immunology in April 1974. Köhler remained at the Basel Institute for another nine years, during which time he continued investigating antibody diversity and in the early 1980s began working on the development of transgenic mice as a tool to understand the mechanism that underlies self-tolerance. In 1986 Köhler became director of the Max Planck Institute of Immunobiology where he worked until his death in 1995. He died in Freiburg im Breisgau as the consequence of a heart condition.

Personal life

Kohler's father, Karl, was a German, while his mother, Raymonde, belonged to a French family. He married Claudia Reintjes in 1968. His first meeting with Claudia was held when he was doing university studies while Claudia was a physician's assistant. They had three children: Katharina, Lucia and Fabian. He not only worked hard for refining antibodies but also gave his time to his family. George moonlighted as a taxi driver to support his family. Most of the time he spent with his children while driving a small tractor on roads and enjoying roller-skating in streets.

See also
 University of Freiburg Faculty of Biology

References

External links
 

1946 births
1995 deaths
Members of the European Molecular Biology Organization
Nobel laureates in Physiology or Medicine
German Nobel laureates
German immunologists
Max Planck Society people
Recipients of the Albert Lasker Award for Basic Medical Research
Max Planck Institute directors
Deaths from heart disease
University of Freiburg alumni